Virtual World is the sixth young adult novel by the English writer Chris Westwood. It was published in the UK (1996) and in the US (1997) by Viking Penguin. It was long-listed for the Carnegie Medal in 1997.

Synopsis 
Silicon Sphere is the new game with everything: dazzling super-real graphics, atmospheric sounds... but it also has a secret. Those who play it, like games freak Jack North, become so absorbed that it is as if they are hidden inside the game. Stranger still, elements from Silicon Sphere are starting to reproduce themselves in the real world. Jack thinks he is imagining it until other players start to disappear. By the time he realizes that this is no game, it is too late to make his way back

Reviews 
Times Educational Supplement: A powerful cyberspace novel that chillingly explores the manner in which players of computer games can become so absorbed by their digital adventures that it seems as if they are actually living in and interacting with the VDU landscape. This is a gripping and important book, written in the tradition of Aldous Huxley's Brave New World.

References

1996 British novels
Novels by Chris Westwood
British young adult novels
Children's science fiction novels
1996 children's books
Viking Press books